Daniel Francis Coughlin (born 1938 in Cleveland, Ohio) is a longtime sports anchor/reporter for WJW Fox 8 in Cleveland, author, and former sports writer for the Cleveland Plain Dealer.

Early life
Coughlin was born in 1938 and lived in the Collinwood neighborhood on Cleveland's east side until 1941, when his parents moved to a home on the city's west side near St. Ignatius High School.

A time later, Coughlin's family moved again to suburban Lakewood, Ohio, where he attended St. Edward High School, graduating in 1956. Coughlin would later serve a two-year stint in the U.S. Army in the First Armored Division.

Career

Newspapers
Soon after leaving the service, Coughlin would land his first full-time job in the newspaper business, when he became a sports writer for the Cleveland Plain Dealer in 1964.  While with the Plain Dealer, Coughlin was recognized for his work by being named Ohio Sportswriter of the Year by the National Sportscasters and Sportswriters Association (NSSA) in 1976, and serving as president of the Cleveland Press Club from 1981-82.

Coughlin would leave the Plain Dealer in 1982, but would still work part-time as a sports writer in later years, writing sports columns for suburban newspapers such as the Elyria Chronicle Telegram, and the Lake County News Herald.

Television
In 1983, Coughlin would switch to television reporting, becoming a sports reporter/fill-in anchor for WJKW (now WJW) TV 8 in Cleveland, where he remains to the present day.

For the 1990 baseball season, Coughlin served as a play by play announcer for the Cleveland Indians on the then new SportsChannel Ohio (now Fox Sports Ohio).

In recent years, Coughlin has gone into semi-retirement, though he still works part-time at WJW as a co-host of Friday Night Touchdown during high school football season.

Author
Coughlin has written four books featuring anecdotes from his career covering the Cleveland sports scene - Pass the Nuts (2011), Crazy, With The Papers to Prove It (2012), Let's Have Another (2015) and Just One More Story (2018).

Awards and honors
1976 Ohio Sportswriter of the Year (NSSA)
1996 inductee - Cleveland Press Club Journalism Hall of Fame
2002 Society of Professional Journalists (Cleveland chapter) Distinguished Service Award recipient
Two-time Lower Great Lakes Emmy Awards recipient (2010 and 2012 as co-host of Friday Night Touchdown) - Sports Program
2013 Irish-American Archives Society (IAAS) Walks of Life Award recipient
2017 inductee - Greater Cleveland Sports Hall of Fame

References

External links
Dan Coughlin's Personal Blog
Sports Icon Interviews conducted by Coughlin at Cleveland Public Library starting in 2012 and, as of 2018, having over 40 interviews of northeast Ohio sports personalities.

1938 births
Living people
Television anchors from Cleveland
American newspaper writers
United States Army soldiers
Cleveland Indians announcers